Intimate and Live may refer to:
 Intimate and Live (concert tour), a concert tour of Kylie Minogue
 Intimate and Live (album), an album from the tour
 Intimate and Live (DVD), a concert DVD of the tour

See also
 Live: Intimate & Interactive, a DVD by the Tea Party
 Live and Intimate, a concert film on the Bloc Party album Intimacy